The history of women on US stamps begins in 1893, when Queen Isabella became the first woman on a US stamp. Queen Isabella helped support Christopher Columbus's 1492 voyage, and 1893 marked the end of a year-long celebration of the 400th anniversary of that voyage. The first US stamp honoring an American woman honored Martha Washington, and it was issued in 1902. In 1907, Pocahontas became the first Native American woman (and the first Native American) to be honored on a US stamp. In 1978, Harriet Tubman became the first African-American woman to be honored on a US stamp. In 2001, Frida Kahlo became the first Hispanic woman to be honored on a US stamp, though she was Mexican not American.

Groups of women have also been honored on US stamps, for example Gold Star Mothers (1948) and "Women In Our Armed Services" (1952).

There are also generic, unnamed women who appear on US stamps, such as a woman marching with men for the National Recovery Act (1933).

US stamps have also depicted female goddesses and allegories, such as personifications of liberty.

List of women on US stamps 

This list can be expanded with women stamps from here 

Sources:

References 

Postage stamps of the United States
Postal history of the United States
 
Lists of women
Women in the United States